Ryo Hayashizaki (born June 12, 1988) was a baseball infielder for the Saitama Seibu Lions of Nippon Professional Baseball.

References

External links

1988 births
Living people
Japanese baseball players
Nippon Professional Baseball second basemen
Nippon Professional Baseball shortstops
Nippon Professional Baseball third basemen
Saitama Seibu Lions players
Baseball people from Hyōgo Prefecture
Toyo University alumni